The 2014 Weymouth and Portland Borough Council election took place on 22 May 2014 to elect members of Weymouth and Portland Borough Council in England. This was on the same day as other local elections.

The elections saw the Labour Party gain 3 seats and become the largest party on the council with 15 seats, but without an overall majority. The Conservative Party was reduced to 11 seats compared to the 14 they had after the 2012 election.

After the election, the composition of the council was
Labour 15
Conservative 11
Liberal Democrat 7
Independent 2
UKIP 1

Election result

Gain/loss is relative to the  2010 results.

Councillors standing down
The following councillors were elected in 2010 and had to seek re-election.

No elections: Radipole, Westham West, Weymouth East

Geoff Petherick became an independent in May 2011.

Ward results

References

2014 English local elections
2014
2010s in Dorset